Gary Reilly (born New Zealand, 1945) is an Australian radio and television producer and writer. He is known for his work on a variety of comedy series such as The Naked Vicar Show, Kingswood Country, Hey Dad..! and Bullpitt!. He won several Australian Writers Guild awards and Logies, as well as being inducted into the Australian Writers' Hall Of Fame.

Career 
Reilly started work as a trainee with the New Zealand Broadcasting Corporation in 1964, working in various production roles before he moved to advertising; working mostly freelance in most of the industry's creative departments: as writer, art director, production manager, director and MC in New Zealand and Great Britain, then from 1970, in Australia.

Around 1972 he teamed up with Tony Sattler, initially to make television commercials, then with the advent of the ABC's youth radio station 2JJ, to create humorous pieces: "anti-ads" satirizing the advertising industry, mock soap-operas (The Novels of Fiona Wintergreen), space-operas (Chuck Chunder of the Space Patrol) and hospital shows (Doctors and Nurses).  
 
The pivotal radio show for their company RS Productions was The Naked Vicar Show broadcast nationally from 1976 to 1977, subsequently Channel Seven commissioned a television version broadcast in 1977 and 1978, which in turn provided the basis for the Logie-winning Kingswood Country. From 1984 Gary worked independently with his own company Gary Reilly Productions. From 1986 to 1994 Gary produced a series Hey Dad.. for Channel Seven with writer John Flanagan, then in 1997 Bullpitt!, featuring the main character ('Ted Bullpitt') from Kingswood Country, now living in a retirement home.

Awards 
Reilly and Sattler won two Logie Awards — Best Comedy
 Kingswood Country 1981 and 1982.
They won two Australian Writer's Guild AWGIE Awards — Best Comedy (radio)
1979 — You only live once
1980 — Sunday morning fever
He and Sattler received the 1997 Australian Writer's Guild Freddie Parsons Award for Lifetime Contribution to Comedy.

References

External links
https://www.imdb.com/name/nm0717685/bio

1945 births
Living people
Australian advertising executives
Australian comedy writers
Australian television writers
Australian television producers
New Zealand emigrants to Australia
Australian male television writers